Torce is one of thirteen parishes (administrative divisions) in Teverga, a municipality within the province and autonomous community of Asturias, in northern Spain. It is within the outskirts of the Natural Park of Fuentes del Narcea, Degaña, and Ibias.

The postal code is 33111.

References

Parishes in Teverga